Capesterre-de-Marie-Galante (often simply referred to as Capesterre) is a commune on the island of Marie-Galante, in the French overseas region and department of Guadeloupe, itself in the Lesser Antilles.

Capesterre-de-Marie-Galante is located on the southeast coast of Marie-Galante. The population density is 75 persons per km2.

History
The name of the commune comes from cabesterre, vocabulary of marine of use to the 17th century which indicated a ground exposed to the east winds. In 1928, a cyclone struck hard the borough which had to be rebuilt.

Geography
Capesterre is situated southeast on the island of Marie-Galante. The port of Capesterre and its long beaches are protected from the waves of the Atlantic by the coral reefs.

Climate
Like any other Eastern Caribbean town, Capesterre experiences quite evenly spread rainfall during the year, with a wetter season between July and November which coincides with hurricane season. The town receives 1500–2500 mm of rainfall. Tropical heat is the norm, bringing constant highs of around 32 °C (89 °F) that drop to 20 °C (68 °F) at night.

Trade winds, called alizés, blow from the northeast and often temper the climate.

Population

Economy
Capesterre is partly surrounded by forest and scrubland. North, there are sugar fields where sugar is produced. Other food crops such as bananas, cocoa and coffee are also grown. Fishing is also done at the harbor.

There are also manufacturing factories near Capesterre. There is one rum distillery at Capesterre, Bellevue Distillery and it produces Rum Domaine de Bellevue. Also, there is a factory where the production of Moysan Cane syrup. This is a traditional and typical Marie-Galantine product. It is the by-product from the cooked juices of the canes.

Tourism is not a full-scale industry. Capesterre has two hotels nearby and several restaurants. The beaches attract tourists to Marie-Galante.

Education
Public preschools and primary schools include:
 Ecole primaire André Pasbeau
 Ecole primaire A.Diallo Boecasse
 Ecole maternelle les Coccinelles

Public junior high schools include:
 Collége Nelson Mandela

Sights
Capesterre is especially famous for its beaches such as the beach of Feuillère & the beach of Petite Anse.

The Bézard Windmill is the first windmill in the French West Indies to have been reconstructed to its original state and returned to proper working condition. It is one of the rare mills in Marie-Galante to have benefited from modernism at the end of the 19th century in the area of sugar cane grinding. Its structure is completely metal with horizontal rollers for more efficiency.

The wind engine power plant Petite Place was put into operation in 1998. It produces electricity that is directly deposited into the reserves of EDF (French Electrics). Thanks to the trade winds 30% of the Island's electrical consumption is produced.

The church of the Holy-Anne is located near the bay.

Exploitation Rousseau et Fils is an ox drawn wagon tour company in Capesterre.

Le Discothèque Touloulou is a night club in Capesterre and it opens from 10 p.m.

Photo gallery

See also

Communes of the Guadeloupe department

References

Marie-Galante
Communes of Marie-Galante
Communes of Guadeloupe